The Clearing House Interbank Payments System (CHIPS) is a United States private clearing house for large-value transactions. By 2015, it was settling well over US$1.5 trillion a day in around 250,000 interbank payments in cross border and domestic transactions. Together with the Fedwire Funds Service (which is operated by the Federal Reserve Banks), CHIPS forms the primary U.S. network for large-value domestic and international USD payments where it has a market share of around 96%. CHIPS transfers are governed by Article 4A of Uniform Commercial Code. 

Unlike the Fedwire system which is part of a regulatory body, CHIPS is owned by the financial institutions that use it.  For payments that are less time-sensitive in nature, banks typically prefer to use CHIPS instead of Fedwire, as CHIPS is less expensive (both by charges and by funds required).  One of the reasons is that Fedwire is a real-time gross settlement system, while CHIPS allows payments to be netted.

Differences from Fedwire

CHIPS differs from the Fedwire payment system in three key ways. First, it is privately owned (by The Clearing House Payments Company LLC), whereas the Fed is part of a regulatory body. Second, it has 47 member participants (with some merged banks constituting separate participants), compared with 9,289 banking institutions (as of March 19, 2009) eligible to make and receive funds via Fedwire. Third, it is a netting engine (and hence, not real-time).

A netting engine consolidates all of the pending payments into fewer single transactions. For example, if Bank of America is to pay American Express $1.2 million, and American Express is to pay Bank of America $800,000, the CHIPS system aggregates this to a single payment of $400,000 from Bank of America to American Express. The Fedwire system would require two separate payments for the full amounts ($1.2 million to American Express and $800,000 to Bank of America).

Members
CHIPS is owned by the financial institutions. According to the Federal Financial Institutions Examination Council (FFIEC), an interagency office of the United States government, "any banking organization with a regulated U.S. presence may become an owner and participate in the network." CHIPS participants may be commercial banks, Edge Act corporations or investment companies. Until 1998, to be a CHIPS participant, a financial institution was required to maintain a branch or an agency in New York City. A non-participant wishing to make international payments using CHIPS was required to employ one of the CHIPS participants to act as its correspondent or agent.

List of members
, the member participants (with country of ownership) are:
 Banco Bilbao Vizcaya, S.A. (Spain)

 Banco do Brasil S.A. (Brazil)
 Bangkok Bank Public Company Limited (Thailand)
 Bank Leumi USA (United States)
 Bank of America, N.A. (United States)
 Bank of China (China)
 Bank of Communications (China)

 The Bank of Tokyo-Mitsubishi UFJ, Ltd. (Japan)
Barclays Bank PLC (United Kingdom)
 BNP Paribas New York (France)
 Brown Brothers Harriman & Company (United States)
 Crédit Agricole (France)
 Citibank, N.A. (United States)
 Commerzbank AG (Germany)
 Credit Industriel et Commercial (France)
 Deutsche Bank AG (Germany)
 Deutsche Bank Trust Co Americas (formerly Bankers Trust; United States)
 Habib American Bank (United States)
 HSBC Bank USA (United States)
 Mega International Commercial Bank (Taiwan)
 Intesa Sanpaolo (Italy)
 Israel Discount Bank of New York (United States)
 JPMorgan Chase Bank, N.A. (United States)
 KBC Bank N.V. (Belgium)
 Mashreq Bank (United Arab Emirates)
 M&T Bank (United States)
 Mitsubishi UFJ Trust and Banking Corporation (NY Branch; Japan)
 Mizuho Corporate Bank - NY (Japan)
 The Bank of New York Mellon (United States)
 The Northern Trust Company (United States)
 The Royal Bank of Scotland (United Kingdom)
 Société Générale (France)
 Standard Chartered Bank (United Kingdom)
 State Bank of India (India)
 State Street Bank and Trust Company (United States)
 Sumitomo Mitsui Banking Corporation (Japan)
 UBS AG (Switzerland)
 Wells Fargo Bank, NY INTL (United States)

See also
 Clearing (finance)
 ACH Network - electronic payment network in the United States
 CHAPS - the UK equivalent of CHIPS
 Clearing House Association - banking lobby organization
 Electronic Payments Network - private sector ACH operator
 National Automated Clearing House
 Society for Worldwide Interbank Financial Telecommunication (SWIFT)

References

External links
 Fedwire and Clearing House Interbank Payments System Retrieved Nov. 28, 2005.
 The Clearing House Interbank Payment System

Real-time gross settlement
Financial services companies based in New York City
Interbank networks